Cahn is a Germanized form of the Jewish surname Cohen, another variant of which is Kahn.

People with the surname Cahn 
 Jonathan Cahn (born 1959), American Messianic minister and writer
 Andrew Cahn (born 1951), British civil servant
 Anne Cahn, American disarmament expert
 Audrey Cahn (1905–2008), Australian microbiologist and nutritionist
 Edgar S. Cahn (1935–2022), American professor, CEO of TimeBanks USA
 Edward Cahn (director) (1899–1963), American film director
 Edward Cahn (jurist), attorney and U.S. federal judge
 Ester Samuel-Cahn (1933–2015), Israeli statistician and educator
 John W. Cahn (born 1927), American materials scientist and physicist
 Lillian Cahn (1923–2013), Hungarian-born American businesswoman and designer, co-founder of Coach Inc.
 Miles Cahn (1921–2017), American businessman, co-founder of Coach Inc.
 Miriam Cahn (born 1949), Swiss painter
 Robert W. Cahn (1924–2007), British metallurgist
 Sammy Cahn (1913–1993), American musician
 Susan Cahn, women's and LGBTQ studies historian

See also 
 Cahn-Ingold-Prelog priority rule
 Canadian Anti-Hate Network
 Caan (disambiguation), Kaan (disambiguation)
 Cann (disambiguation), Kan (surname), Kann (disambiguation)

Kohenitic surnames
Jewish surnames
Yiddish-language surnames